Laura Serrano Garcia (born October 20, 1967 in Mexico City) is a Mexican boxer.

Serrano began boxing at the Universidad Nacional Autónoma de México in Mexico City, where she was studying to become a lawyer. She wanted to lose weight and stay in shape. She applied for a professional boxer's license in Mexico. After a short appearance in two episodes of the Volver a empezar soap opera, she went to Las Vegas, and on a pay per view card she challenged Christy Martin for the world title. It was her first fight as a professional and resulted in a draw.

Serrano's next fight was against world champion Deirdre Gogarty. She won by a knockout in seven rounds, in what was the first all women's boxing undercard held at the Aladdin Hotel & Casino in Las Vegas.

Serrano was supposed to box on the Julio César Chávez-Miguel Ángel González Pay Per View event's undercard in Mexico City. However, a ban from 1947 was found, forbidding women from boxing events in Mexico City. Thanks in part to Serrano's subsequent legal battle, the ordinance was dropped.

Serrano suffered a foot injury for which she underwent surgery, but in 1999 she came back and won a decision in her comeback bout. She then, on 2 September 1999, [details from her BoxRec page] met and defeated the world champion Tracy Byrd to become Mexico's first woman world boxing champion.

She defended her title against Cinthya Prouder (won in a unanimous decision after round 6), Alicia Ashley (won in a unanimous decision after round 8), Gina Greenwald (knockout in round 1) and Kelsey Jeffries (knockout in round 3), followed. The Jeffries fight resulted in Jeffries' first defeat.

On August 12, 2008, Serrano challenged Melissa Del Valle for the Junior Lightweight title. Once again, this world title attempt resulted in a draw (tie).

Serrano has won her last two world title defenses, both decisions, one in ten rounds in Las Vegas and another one, a six-round win in Phoenix.

Personal 
As of 2005, she was engaged to be married. Serrano is also a lawyer.

During 2015, she was inducted as the first Mexican female boxer in the International Women's Boxing Hall of Fame.

Professional boxing record

References

External links

Further reading

1967 births
Living people
Mexican women boxers
Boxers from Mexico City
Southpaw boxers
National Autonomous University of Mexico alumni
World boxing champions
Featherweight boxers